The women's 100 metres event at the 2006 World Junior Championships in Athletics was held in Beijing, China, at Chaoyang Sports Centre on 15 and 16 August.

Medalists

Results

Final
16 August
Wind: -0.8 m/s

Semifinals
15 August

Semifinal 1
Wind: -0.9 m/s

Semifinal 2
Wind: -0.6 m/s

Semifinal 3
Wind: -1.8 m/s

Heats
15 August

Heat 1
Wind: +0.6 m/s

Heat 2
Wind: +0.4 m/s

Heat 3
Wind: +0.3 m/s

Heat 4
Wind: +1.6 m/s

Heat 5
Wind: +1.1 m/s

Heat 6
Wind: +0.8 m/s

Heat 7
Wind: +0.1 m/s

Heat 8
Wind: +0.6 m/s

Participation
According to an unofficial count, 63 athletes from 46 countries participated in the event.

References

100 metres
100 metres at the World Athletics U20 Championships